Linson is a surname. Notable people with the surname include:

Art Linson (born 1942), American film producer, director, and screenwriter
John J. Linson (1850–1915), American lawyer and politician
John Linson, American film and television producer

See also
Hinson (surname)